Wura is a rural locality in the Rockhampton Region, Queensland, Australia.

History 
The locality takes its name from its former railway station, which is believed to be an Aboriginal word meaning kangaroo.

Konara State School opened in 1919. It closed in 1927.

Wura State School opened on 10 March 1924 and closed circa 1944.

References 

Suburbs of Rockhampton Region
Localities in Queensland